The London Bridge – Greenwich Railway Viaduct consists of a series of nineteen brick railway viaducts linked by road bridges between London Bridge railway station and Deptford Creek, which together make a single structure  in length. The structure carries the former London and Greenwich Railway line and consists of 851 semi-circular arches and 27 skew arches or road bridges. It is the longest run of arches in Britain, It is also one of the oldest railway viaducts in the world, and the earliest example of an entirely elevated railway line. It was built between 1834 and 1836. It is a Grade II listed structure.

History

The idea of a railway from London to Greenwich built on a viaduct, came from engineer Colonel George Thomas Landmann, and entrepreneur George Walter, and a company was floated on 25 November 1831, which obtained Parliamentary approval in 1833.  The line was elevated to avoid numerous level crossings over the many streets which were already appearing in the south of London. The intention had been for the line to descend to ground level after crossing the Grand Surrey Canal but this was opposed by Parliament, and so it remained elevated as far as Deptford Creek on the River Ravensbourne, where there was a bascule bridge.

Original viaduct

The contractor was Hugh McIntosh, who used sixty million bricks to construct the viaduct, with 400 navvies using more than 100,000 per day, creating a shortage for other building activities in London. They were all made at Sittingbourne and transported to the site by barge. Work started on the foundations in February 1834, and in places they had to dig down 24 feet to get a firm foundation for the arches. The first experimental trains were run in 1835. The structure was not however completed until December 1836, due to delays in obtaining materials for the Bermondsey Street bridge near to London Bridge. As originally constructed the viaduct included a 'pedestrian boulevard' where users could walk for a penny toll, but this was quickly replaced by an additional running line. The viaduct included the stations of London Bridge, Spa Road, Bermondsey (closed 1915) and Deptford. A further station on top of the viaduct at Southwark Park was opened in 1902, but also closed in 1915.

Corbett's Lane Junction

During 1838 and 1839 the London and Croydon Railway (L&CR) constructed a junction with the viaduct leading to its own  viaduct shortly after Corbett's Lane, Deptford, and thereafter shared the L&GR route to London Bridge. 'Corbett's Lane Junction' became one of the first major railway junctions in the world'. A 'policeman' was stationed at the junction to control movements of the trains, who was soon afterwards situated on a wooden tower on the viaduct to give him better visibility. The 'Corbett's lane lighthouse', as it was known, was the precursor of the modern signal box.

Southern widening
The L&CR lines into London were also shared with the London and Brighton Railway from 1841 and were due to do so with the South Eastern Railway (SER) from 1842. During 1841 it became obvious that the original viaduct would be inadequate to share the growing traffic of four railway companies, and so the L&GR constructed a second adjoining viaduct on the south side of the original as far as Corbett's Lane. This provided two further tracks, which together with the southern viaduct were later leased by the London Brighton and South Coast Railway, the successor to both the L&CR and the L&BR.

Northern widening

This work was completed by 1850. The SER later constructed a link from this structure leading to its Bricklayers Arms branch line.

Use of the arches
The London and Greenwich Railway directors originally envisaged using the arches for low cost housing, but were soon dissuaded of the plan. The arches are extensively used for light engineering workshops, scrap dealers, and lockups. In recent years some of the arches have been used for fashionable restaurants and nightclubs.

Gallery

See also
 List of railway bridges and viaducts in the United Kingdom

References

Bibliography
 
 
 
 

Railway viaducts in London
Former toll bridges in England